3D Life is a cellular automaton. It is a three-dimensional extension of Game of Life, investigated by Carter Bays.  A number of different semitotalistic rules for the 3D rectangular Moore neighborhood were investigated.

It was popularized by A. K. Dewdney in his "Computer Recreations" column in Scientific American magazine.

References
.
.
.

External links
 Kaleidoscope of 3D Life

Cellular automaton rules